Chilton Scott Stratton (October 2, 1869 – March 8, 1939) was an American pitcher and outfielder in Major League Baseball from 1888 to 1895. He played for the Louisville Colonels, Pittsburgh Pirates, and Chicago Colts.

Biography
Stratton was born in Campbellsburg, Kentucky, in 1869. He started his professional baseball career in 1888. Primarily a pitcher, Stratton sometimes played in the outfield on days he didn't pitch because of his hitting and fielding skills.

Stratton's best season was his third, in 1890. Playing for Louisville as a 20-year old, he had 431 innings pitched, a 34–14 win–loss record, a 2.36 earned run average (ERA), a 164 ERA+, and 207 strikeouts. He led the American Association in ERA and ERA+ and set a major league record by starting 25 consecutive games that his team won. Louisville won the pennant. There were three major leagues in 1890, and the AA was the weakest of the three. In the 1890 World Series, Stratton made three starts and went 1–1.

Stratton's statistics were never as good before or after the 1890 season, though he did win 21 games in 1892. His major league career ended in 1895. In his major league career, Stratton had a 97–114 record, a 3.87 ERA, 570 strikeouts, and a .274 batting average. Afterwards, he played in the minor leagues as an outfielder until 1900.

Stratton was a Sabbatarian, and for most of his career, he refused to play baseball on Sundays. He married Bessie Anderson in 1890, and the couple had a son in 1891 and a daughter in 1893. Stratton's brother-in-law was Bill Anderson.

Stratton died in Louisville, Kentucky, in 1939.

See also
List of Major League Baseball annual ERA leaders
List of Major League Baseball single-season wins leaders

References

External links

1869 births
1939 deaths
19th-century baseball players
Major League Baseball pitchers
Louisville Colonels players
Pittsburgh Pirates players
Chicago Colts players
St. Paul Apostles players
St. Paul Saints (Western League) players
Springfield Ponies players
Springfield Maroons players
Reading Actives players
Reading Coal Heavers players
Bristol Bell Makers players
Wilkes-Barre Coal Barons players
Hartford Indians players
Wooden Nutmegs players
Baseball players from Kentucky
People from Henry County, Kentucky